Philippe Stott (born 3 November 1957) is a French bobsledder. He competed in the four man event at the 1984 Winter Olympics.

References

1957 births
Living people
French male bobsledders
Olympic bobsledders of France
Bobsledders at the 1984 Winter Olympics
Sportspeople from Paris